The 218th Maneuver Enhancement Brigade (218th MEB) is a rear area support brigade of the South Carolina Army National Guard, headquartered at Charleston. It derives its history from the previous 218th Infantry Brigade (Mechanized) (Separate), originally formed from the 2nd Brigade of the former 30th Infantry Division on 1 January 1974. On 1 September 2008, the Headquarters and Headquarters Detachment of the 105th Signal Battalion became the Headquarters and Headquarters Company (HHC) of the 218th MEB. On 1 March 2009, the HHC of the 218th Infantry Brigade was consolidated with the HHC of the 218th MEB, becoming the 218th MEB.

Composition
218th Maneuver Enhancement Brigade (218th MEB), Charleston
 Headquarters and Headquarters Company (HHC), Charleston
 1st Battalion, 118th Infantry Regiment, Mullins
 HHC, Mount Pleasant
 Company A, Moncks Corner
 Company B, North Charleston
 Company C, Mullins
 Company D, Marion
 1118th Forward Support Company (1118th FSC), North Charleston
 4th Battalion, 118th Infantry Regiment, Union. (30th ABCT)
 HHC, Union.
 Company A, Conway.
 Company B, Gaffney.
 Company C, Fountain Inn.
 Hotel Company, Greer. (formerly 1263rd FSC)
 218th Brigade Support Battalion (218th BSB), Varnville, SC
 111th Signal Company, North Charleston
 108th Chemical Company, North Charleston.

References 

Military units and formations in South Carolina
Maneuver Enhancement Brigades of the United States Army
Military units and formations established in 1974